Sir Frank Woods KBE ChStJ (6 April 1907 – 29 November 1992) was an English-born Anglican bishop. From 1957 to 1977, he served as Archbishop of Melbourne. He was additionally the Primate of Australia between 1971 and 1977.

Early life
Woods was the son of the Right Reverend Edward Sydney Woods (1877-1953), Bishop of Lichfield, and Clemence Barclay. He was the brother of the photographer Janet Woods, Samuel Woods, an archdeacon in New Zealand, and Robin Woods, Bishop of Worcester, and a nephew of Theodore Woods, who served as Bishop of Winchester. He was educated at Marlborough before going up to Trinity College, Cambridge.

Ordained ministry
Woods was ordained as a priest in 1932, After a curacy at St Mary's Church, Portsea in the Diocese of Portsmouth he became chaplain of his Cambridge alma mater, Trinity College. He then became Vice-Principal of Wells Theological College.  During the Second World War, he served as a chaplain in the Royal Naval Volunteer Reserve and then, successively, a vicar in Huddersfield (1945–52); Suffragan Bishop of Middleton (1952–57); and, in 1957, Archbishop of Melbourne for over 20 years. From 1971 he was also the Anglican Primate of Australia.

Honours

Woods was appointed, on 3 June 1972, a Knight Commander of the Order of the British Empire (KBE). He used the title of "Sir", as is the established protocol in Australia for knighted clergy. He was also a Chaplain of the Order of St John.

References

1907 births
1992 deaths
Clergy from Melbourne
People educated at Marlborough College
Alumni of Trinity College, Cambridge
20th-century Church of England bishops
Royal Naval Volunteer Reserve personnel of World War II
Royal Navy chaplains
Honorary Chaplains to the Queen
Bishops of Middleton
20th-century Anglican archbishops
Anglican archbishops of Melbourne
Primates of the Anglican Church of Australia
Chaplains of the Order of St John
Australian Knights Commander of the Order of the British Empire